The Martin Islands are part of the Arctic Archipelago in the territory of Nunavut. They are located in western Gulf of Boothia near the Boothia Peninsula.

References 

Islands of the Gulf of Boothia
Uninhabited islands of Kitikmeot Region